Tshane Airport  is an airport serving the village of Tshane, Botswana. The Tshane salt pan is very flat and has many tracks but no marked runway.

See also

Transport in Botswana
List of airports in Botswana

References

External links
OpenStreetMap - Tshane
Fallingrain - Tshane Airport

Airports in Botswana